endo-Norborneol is an alcohol.

See also
 Exo-Norborneol

References

External links
 endo-Norborneol MSDS
 Reaction of organic compounds under high temperature – dilute acid (HTDA) conditions. III. The perdeuteration of bicyclo[2.2.1]heptanes PDF
 

Secondary alcohols
Cyclopentanes